The 2023 Toledo Rockets football team  will represent the University of Toledo during the 2023 NCAA Division I FBS football season. The Rockets will be led by eighth-year head coach Jason Candle and play their home games at the Glass Bowl in Toledo, Ohio. They will compete as members of the West Division of the Mid-American Conference (MAC).

Previous season

The Rockets finished the 2022 Toledo Rockets football team 9-5 and 5-3 in the MAC to finish in first place in the West Division. Then they beat the Ohio 17-7 in the 2022 MAC Championship Game. They won the Boca Raton Bowl against Liberty.

Schedule

References

Toledo
Toledo Rockets football seasons
Toledo Football